Mommaga is a 1997 Indian Kannada language romantic drama film directed by V. Ravichandran and produced by Sandesh Nagaraj. Besides Ravichandran, the film stars Meena and Umashri in the leading roles. The songs of the movie composed and written by Hamsalekha were received well.

Cast 
 V. Ravichandran 
 Meena 
 Prakash Rai
 Umashri
 C. R. Simha
 Master Anand
 Ashalatha
 Ramesh Bhat
 Vijay Kashi
 Lakshman
 M. D. Kaushik
 Shanthamma

Soundtrack 
The music was composed and lyrics were written by Hamsalekha. 
A total of 10 tracks have been composed for the film.

References

External links 

 "Akka Thangi" video song

1997 films
1990s Kannada-language films
Indian action drama films
Films scored by Hamsalekha
Films directed by V. Ravichandran
1990s action drama films